The  was a Japanese endurance championship which took place mainly at Fuji International Speedway.

The series began in 1977 and until 1984 was an independent championship with three rounds, all held at Fuji. In the first two seasons the series was contested by Group 6 two-seater racing cars, with some touring cars filling the grid. The Group 6 sportscars were soon replaced by Group 5 silhouettes and 1983 saw the introduction of Group C and IMSA GTP sports prototypes cars. 
In 1985 the three Fuji races were incorporated into All Japan Endurance Championship who already had a Fuji round known as WEC in Japan. As a result, between 1985 and 1990 the Fuji Long Distance Series title was awarded counting the four Fuji rounds from the merged championship.

By 1991 the series was renamed Long Distance Series and counted all races from the All Japan championship, however the series ended after the 1992 season, when the JAF dissolved the All Japan Sports Prototype Championship, ending Group C racing in Japan.

The Fuji Long Distance Series was sanctioned by FISCO Club (currently known as Fuji Motorsports Club) and, as a championship of entrants, the titles were awarded to teams.

Champions

See also
Fuji Grand Champion Series
1999 Le Mans Fuji 1000 km
Japan Le Mans Challenge

References

External links
Pictures from 1977-80 seasons

 
Sports car racing series
Auto racing series in Japan
Group C